The Statehood Green Party, known as DC Statehood Party prior to 1999, is the progressive political party in the District of Columbia. The party is the D.C. affiliate of the national Green Party but has traditionally elevated issues of District of Columbia statehood movement as its primary focus. Party members refer to the Statehood Green Party as the second most popular party in the District because, historically, STG (on the D.C. electoral ballot) candidates win the second highest vote totals in the city, ahead of the Republican Party but behind the Democratic Party. As of February, 2023, there are approximately 4,140 voters registered in the Statehood Green Party. That is 0.79% of registered voters in the city.

History
The party was founded to convince Julius Hobson to run for the District's non-voting Congressional Delegate position as a member of the D.C. Statehood Party. Although Hobson lost that race to Walter E. Fauntroy, Hobson received enough votes to make the party an official major party in the District. Following the election, Hobson helped set up the party in the District. Other notable founders include Josephine Butler and Calvert I. Cassell. The party was organized on the ward level, and ward chairs could decide how to organize their activities in their wards. Hobson later served on the D.C. Council. In 1973, the party was a strong proponent of the District of Columbia Home Rule Act, which gave limited self-government to the District. From the creation of the District Council in 1975 until 1999, the party always had one of the at-large seats, first occupied by Hobson and then by Hilda Mason.

In 1998, a Green Party was founded in D.C. Their candidate for Shadow Representative, Mike Livingston, ran that year. He received 2,000 more votes than necessary for the party to qualify for continued ballot access. In October 1999, the new Green Party merged with the longstanding and larger Statehood Party to form the Statehood Green Party.

In a 2016 district-wide plebiscite, D.C. residents voted in favor of statehood. The party criticized the lack of involvement of regular citizens in the process.

See also
D.C. Statehood
District of Columbia voting rights

References

External links

Green Party of the United States
Political parties established in 1971
 D.C. Statehood Green Party
Political parties in the District of Columbia
1971 establishments in Washington, D.C.